Mary Jane Bowie (born 3 March 1948) is a Canadian luger. She competed in the women's singles event at the 1976 Winter Olympics.

References

1948 births
Living people
Canadian female lugers
Olympic lugers of Canada
Lugers at the 1976 Winter Olympics
Sportspeople from Ottawa